The following is a list of species of Cicindelinae from India is based on Pearson et al. Those indicated as E are endemic to the country.

 Grammognatha euphratica
 Tricondyla femorata
 Tricondyla gounellei 
 Tricondyla macrodera
 Tricondyla tuberculata
 Derocrania longesulcata (E)
 Derocrania honorei (E)
 Derocrania dembickyi (E)
 Derocrania brevicollis (E)
 Protocollyris nilgiriensis (E)
 Protocollyris pacholatkoi (E)
 Protocollyris brevilabris
 Protocollyris fragilis (E)
 Neocollyris purpureomaculata
 Neocollyris ingridae (E)
 Neocollyris macilenta (E)
 Neocollyris annulicornis (E)
 Neocollyris roeschkei
 Neocollyris pearsoni (E)
 Neocollyris cyaneipalpis (E)
 Neocollyris quadrisulcata (E)
 Neocollyris redtenbacheri
 Neocollyris schaumi (E)
 Neocollyris bonellii
 Neocollyris distincta (E)
 Neocollyris nepalensis
 Neocollyris hiekei (E)
 Neocollyris cruentata
 Neocollyris batesi
 Neocollyris orichalcina
 Neocollyris fuscitarsis
 Neocollyris insignis
 Neocollyris smaragdina
 Neocollyris saphyrina
 Neocollyris egregia (E)
 Neocollyris similis
 Neocollyris rufipalpis
 Neocollyris crassicornis
 Neocollyris subclavata
 Neocollyris acuteapicalis (E)
 Neocollyris multipilosa (E)
 Neocollyris attenuata
 Neocollyris brancuccii (E)
 Neocollyris brendelli (E)
 Neocollyris parvula (E)
 Neocollyris maindroni (E)
 Neocollyris kollari (E)
 Neocollyris variicornis
 Neocollyris pacholatkoi (E)
 Neocollyris variitarsis
 Neocollyris ampullicollis (E)
 Neocollyris plicicollis (E)
 Neocollyris metallica (E)
 Neocollyris subtileflavescens (E)
 Neocollyris rugata (E)
 Neocollyris conspicua (E)
 Neocollyris vannideki (E)
 Neocollyris flava (E)
 Neocollyris juengeri (E)
 Neocollyris anthracina (E)
 Neocollyris nilgirica (E)
 Neocollyris andrewesi (E)
 Neocollyris rubens
 Neocollyris compressicollis
 Neocollyris apteroides (E)
 Neocollyris foveifrons
 Neocollyris assamensis (E)
 Neocollyris coapteroides (E)
 Neocollyris smithii
 Collyris longicollis
 Collyris dohrnii
 Collyris brevipennis (E)
 Collyris subtilesculpta (E)
 Collyris dormeri 
 Therates annandalei (E)
 Therates nepalensis
 Therates jendeki (E)
 Therates arunachalcolus (E)
 Therates ingridae (E)
 Therates susai (E)
 Therates dohertyi (E)
 Therates waagenorum (E)
 Therates westbengalensis (E)
 Therates hennigi (E)
 Rhytidophaena limbata
 Rhytidophaena inornata (E)
 Prothyma proxima
 Prothyma assamensis
 Heptodonta pulchella
 Pronyssa hennigi (E)
 Pronyssa nodicollis
 Pronyssa kraatzi (E)
 Pronyssa assamensis (E)
 Pronyssa montanea (E)
 Calochroa flavomaculata
 Calochroa sexpunctata
 Calochroa whithillii (E)
 Calochroa octonotata
 Calochroa tritoma
 Calochroa octogramma
 Calochroa safraneki (E)
 Calochroa fabriciana (E)
 Calochroa assamensis
 Calochroa bicolor
 Calochroa hamiltoniana (E)
 Cicindela granulata
 Cicindela cyanea
 Cicindela angulicollis (E)
 Cicindela shivah
 Cicindela princeps
 Cicindela aurofasciata (E)
 Cicindela goryi (E)
 Cicindela guttata (E)
 Cicindela andrewesi (E)
 Cicindela calligramma
 Calomera littoralis
 Calomera aulica
 Calomera angulata
 Calomera fowleri (E)
 Calomera plumigera
 Calomera cardoni
 Calomera chloris
 Calomera funerea
 Calomera quadripunctulata (E)
 Cosmodela intermedia
 Cosmodela fleutiauxi
 Cosmodela duponti
 Cosmodela diehli
 Cosmodela juxtata
 Cosmodela virgula
 Plutacia dives
 Plutacia notopleuralis
 Lophyra catena
 Lophyra cerina
 Lophyra striatifrons
 Lophyra histrio
 Lophyra cancellata
 Lophyra striolata
 Lophyra lineifrons
 Lophyra lefroyi
 Lophyra parvimaculata
 Lophyra vittigera
 Lophyra multiguttata
 Chaetodera albina
 Chaetodera vigintiguttata
 Jansensia westermanni (E)
 Jansensia pseudodromica (E)
 Jansensia nathanorum (E)
 Jansensia dasiodes (E)
 Jansensia biundata (E)
 Jansensia semisetigerosa (E)
 Jansensia vestiplicatica (E)
 Jansensia legnotia (E)
 Jansensia plagatima (E)
 Jansensia bangalorensis (E)
 Jansensia ostrina (E)
 Jansensia corrugatosa (E)
 Jansensia cratera (E)
 Jansensia choriodista (E)
 Jansensia prothymoides (E)
 Jansensia crassipalpis (E)
 Jansensia testrastacta
 Jansensia chlorida (E)
 Jansensia psarodea (E)
 Jansensia rostrulla (E)
 Jansensia grossula (E)
 Jansensia venus (E)
 Jansensia stuprata (E)
 Jansensia fusissima (E)
 Jansensia chloropleura
 Jansensia viridicincta (E)
 Jansensia azureocincta (E)
 Jansensia rugosiceps (E)
 Jansensia sandurica (E)
 Jansensia motschulskyana (E)
 Jansensia indica (E)
 Jansensia reticulella (E)
 Jansensia tetragrammica (E)
 Jansensia applanata (E)
 Glomera belloides (E)
 Glomera ochrocnemis (E)
 Setinteridenta rhytidopteroides
 Cylindera paradoxa
 Cylindera lacunosa
 Cylindera obliquefasciata
 Cylindera dromicoides
 Cylindera foveolata
 Cylindera cyclobregma
 Cylindera viduata
 Cylindera karli (E)
 Cylindera viridilabris
 Cylindera labioaenea
 Cylindera fallaciosa
 Cylindera severini
 Cylindera collicia
 Cylindera nietneri
 Cylindera belli (E)
 Cylindera umbropolita
 Cylindera seriepunctata
 Cylindera melitops (E)
 Cylindera spinolae
 Cylindera dartista
 Cylindera paucipilina
 Cylindera limitisca
 Cylindera subtilesignata
 Cylindera decempunctata
 Cylindera anelia (E)
 Cylindera sikhimensis
 Cylindera discreta
 Cylindera kaleea
 Cylindera albopunctata
 Cylindera sublacerata
 Cylindera mesoepisternalis
 Cylindera bigemina
 Cylindera procera (E)
 Cylindera brevis
 Cylindera minuta
 Cylindera cognata
 Cylindera erudita
 Cylindera agnata
 Cylindera ancistridia (E)
 Cylindera venosa
 Cylindera grammophora
 Cylindera singalensis
 Myriochila fastidiosa
 Myriochila litigiosa
 Myriochila undulata
 Myriochila dubia
 Myriochila atelesta
 Myriochila melancholica
 Myriochila distinguenda
 Salpingophora maindroni
 Hypaetha quadrilineata
 Hypaetha biramosa
 Hypaetha copulata
 Callytron gyllenhalii
 Callytron limosum
 Callytron malabaricum
 Apteroessa grossa (E)

References 

Insects of India
Lists of insects by location
Lists of insects